Erikli is a village in the Burdur District of Burdur Province in Turkey. Its population is 63 (2021).

History
Name of the village is mentioned as Hacıefe in the records of 1925. While it was a neighborhood of Kozluca village before, it gained the status of a village on 21 June 1948.

References

Villages in Burdur District